Alain Suied (July 17, 1951 – July 24, 2008) was a French poet and translator.

Early life and career 
Suied was born in Tunis into what was then the Jewish community in that city. In 1959 he moved to Paris with his parents. His first poem was published in 1968 in the journal L'Ephemeral. Andre du Bouchet helped him get his first book published in 1970. Suied received the Nelly Sachs Prize for translation.

He is buried in the cemetery of Montparnasse.

Notes

1951 births
2008 deaths
Writers from Tunis
French male poets
20th-century French poets
20th-century French male writers